The Journal of Social Psychology is a bimonthly academic journal covering social psychology published by Routledge, who acquired it from Heldref Publications in 2009. The journal was established in 1929 by John Dewey and Carl Murchison. It covers all areas of basic and applied social psychology. The journal was subtitled Political, Racial and Differential Psychology until changing its name in 1949. The Journal incorporated with Genetic, Social, and General Psychology Monographs between 1925 - 2006

Contents 
The Journal of Social Psychology focuses on original empirical research.  Most of the articles report laboratory or field research that covers a variety of topics in core areas of social and organizational psychology, including (but not limited to): the self and social identity, person perception and social cognition, attitudes and persuasion, social influence, consumer behavior, decision making, groups and teams, stereotypes and discrimination, interpersonal attraction and relationships, prosocial behavior, aggression, organizational behavior, leadership, and cultural psychology. The journal publishes work from all over the world and aims to improve the integration of contemporary social sciences.

See also

 Lists of academic journals
 List of psychology journals
 Social psychology
 Social psychology (sociology)

References

External links

Bimonthly journals
English-language journals
Publications established in 1929
Social psychology journals
Routledge academic journals